Anak Kayan (Children of Kayan) is a folk music orchestra in Malaysia established in 2010 in Kuantan, Pahang. The founder of the group is Noor Azman b. Norawi, better known by his pseudonym Man Kayan.

The orchestra consists of 15 musicians playing traditional Malay instruments (various drums and gongs) and performing folk songs and melodies. The group actively tours the country. It participated many times in the Pangkor International Poetry and Folk Song Festival.

Awards 
 World Homestay Organization Summit for Tourism's Partner (January 27, 2019)

See also 
 Anak Kayan - Berakit Di Sungai Pahang

References

Musical groups established in 2010
Folk music groups
Malaysian musical groups
Pahang
Malay people
2010 establishments in Malaysia